Guangdong Modern Dance Company (GMDC) is the first professional modern dance company in China founded in 1992 by its director Willy Tsao.  The company's former dancers and choreographers include Shen Wei, Xing Liang, Sang Jijia, Yang Yun-tao.

GMDC runs Guangdong Modern Dance Week every year which is one of the major dace festivals in mainland China and Asia

References

External links
 Article: The New Face of Chinese Dance Critical essay about the Guangdong Modern Dance Company

Modern dance companies
Dance companies in China
Organizations established in 1992